Damnagar is a census town in Amreli district  in the state of Gujarat, India.

Geography
It has an average elevation of 136 metres (446 feet). There are many wells and irrigated fields around Dámnagar but there is no major river in the town.

Demographics 

 India census, Damnagar had a population of 16,714. Males constitute 53% of the population and females 47%. Damnagar has an average literacy rate of 66%, higher than the national average of 59.5%: male literacy is 73% and, female literacy is 59%. In Damnagar, 14% of the population is under 6 years of age.there are many oil mils in past.

Kunbis and Kolis formed the major population.

Temples 

Damnagar has many temples. Kumbhnath and Vaijnath Temples in Damnagar are very peaceful and frequently visited by people from nearby villages. Kumbhnath temple located at the bank of a lake. the lake is huge near about 100 acres.

Damnagar railway station 

Damnagar has a railway station on the outskirts of village.  This is a beautiful, small railway station with broad gauge railway line.  The train running on diesel engine works on this route.and train route Dhola Mahuva run with Diesel Engine with considerable speed.

Swaminarayan Gurukul 

Damangar has a large, spacious Swaminarayan temple and a boarding school in the outskirts of the village.  Swaminarayan Gurukul is a temple-school and boarding complex with modern educational facilities.

References 

Cities and towns in Amreli district